The  (Latin for Annals of Wales) is the title given to a complex of Latin chronicles compiled or derived from diverse sources at St David's in Dyfed, Wales. The earliest is a 12th-century presumed copy of a mid-10th-century original; later editions were compiled in the 13th century. Despite the name, the  record not only events in Wales, but also events in Ireland, Cornwall, England, Scotland and sometimes further afield, though the focus of the events recorded especially in the later two-thirds of the text is Wales.

Sources
The principal versions of  appear in four manuscripts:
 A: London, British Library, Harley MS 3859, folios 190r–193r.
 B: London (Kew), National Archives, MS. E.164/1 (K.R. Misc. Books, Series I) pp. 2–26
 C: London, British Library, MS. Cotton Domitian A.i, folios 138r–155r
A is written in a hand of about 1100–1130 AD, and inserted without title into a manuscript (MS) of the  where it is immediately followed by a pedigree for Owain ap Hywel (died 988). Although no explicit chronology is given in the MS, its annals seem to run from about AD 445 to 977 with the last entry at 954, making it likely that the text belongs to the second half of the 10th century.
B was written, probably at the Cistercian abbey of Neath, at the end of the 13th century. It is entitled  [1286].
C is part of a book written at St David's, and is entitled  [1288]; this is also of the late 13th century.

Two of the texts, B and C, begin with a World Chronicle derived from Isidore of Seville's Origines (Book V, ch. 39), through the medium of Bede's Chronica minora. B begins its annals with Julius Caesar's invasion of Britain "sixty years before the incarnation of the Lord." After A.D. 457, B agrees closely with A until A ends. C commences its annals after the empire of Heraclius (AD 610–41) at a year corresponding to AD 677. C mostly agrees with A until A ends, although it is clear that A was not the common source for B and C (Dumville 2002, p. xi). B and C diverge after 1203, C having fewer and briefer Welsh entries.

A alone has benefited from a complete diplomatic edition (Phillimore 1888).

Source for the Arthurian legend
These entries have been presented in the past as proof of the existence of Arthur and Merlin, although that view is no longer widely held because the Arthurian entries could have been added arbitrarily as late as 970, long after the development of the early Arthurian myth.

The entries on Arthur and Mordred in the A Text:

Year 72 (c. AD 516) The Battle of Badon, in which Arthur carried the cross of our Lord Jesus Christ on his shoulders for three days and three nights and the Britons were victors.
Year 93 (c. 537) The Strife of Camlann in which Arthur and Medraut (Mordred) fell and there was death in Britain and in Ireland.

Concerning Arthur's cross at the Battle of Badon, it is mirrored by a passage in Nennius where Arthur was said to have borne the image of the Virgin Mary "on his shoulders" during a battle at a castle called Guinnion. The words for "shoulder" and "shield" were, however, easily confused in Old Welsh   "shield" versus  "shoulder"  and Geoffrey of Monmouth played upon this dual tradition, describing Arthur bearing "on his shoulders a shield" emblazoned with the Virgin.

Merlin (Old Welsh Myrddin) is not mentioned in the A Text, though there is mention of the battle of Arfderydd, associated with him in medieval Welsh literature:

Year 129 (c. 573) The Battle of Armterid

Texts B and C omit the second half of the year 93 entry. B calls Arfderydd "Erderit"; C, "Arderit". In the B Text, the year 129 entry continues: "between the sons of Elifer and Guendoleu son of Keidau in which battle Guendoleu fell and Merlin went mad". Both the B and C texts display the influence of Geoffrey of Monmouth's , and this is reflected in the Arfderydd entry by the choice of the Latinized form Merlinus, first found in Geoffrey's Historia, as opposed to the expected Old Welsh form Merdin.

See also
 English historians in the Middle Ages
 History of Wales

References

Further reading
Brett, Caroline, 1988 'The Prefaces of Two Late Thirteenth-century Welsh Latin Chronicles', Bulletin of the Board of Celtic Studies 35, pp. 64–73.
Dumville, David N., 1972-74 'Some aspects of the chronology of the Historia Brittonum''', Bulletin of the Board of Celtic Studies 25, pp. 439–445.
Dumville, David N., 1977 'Sub-Roman Britain: history and legend', History 62, pp. 173–192.
Dumville, David N., 1977/8 'The Welsh Latin annals', Studia Celtica 12/13, pp. 461–467 (review of Hughes 1974)
Dumville, David N., 1984 'When was the 'Clonmacnoise Chronicle' created? The evidence of the Welsh annals', in Grabowski K. & Dumville D.N., 1984 Chronicles and Annals of Mediaeval Ireland and Wales: The Clonmacnoise-group of texts, Boydell, pp. 209–226.
Dumville, David N. (ed, and trans.), 2002 'Annales Cambriae, A.D. 682-954: Texts A-C in Parallel', Department of Anglo-Saxon, Norse and Celtic, University of Cambridge.
Dumville, David N. 2004 ' Annales Cambriae and Easter', in The Medieval Chronicle III, Rodopi, Amsterdam & New York.
Gough-Cooper, Henry, 2010 'Annales Cambriae, from Saint Patrick to AD 682: Texts A, B & C in Parallel.' The Heroic Age: A Journal of Early Medieval Northwest Europe, Issue 15 (October 2012) The Heroic Age website
Gough-Cooper, Henry, 2018 'Decennovenal Reason and Unreason in the C-text of Annales Cambriae ', in Erik Kooper et al. The Medieval Chronicle 11, Brill, pp. 195–212.
Gough-Cooper, Henry, 2020 'Meet the Ancestors?' in Ben Guy et al. The Chronicles of Medieval Wales and the March, Brepols, pp. 107–138.
Gough-Cooper, Henry, 2021 'How was the chronology of the earliest Welsh Latin chronicle regulated?', Proceedings of the Harvard Celtic Colloquium 39 (2019), pp. 134–165.
Grigg, Erik, 2009 ' 'Mole Rain' and other natural phenomena in the Welsh annals: can mirabilia unravel the textual history of the Annales Cambriae?' Welsh History Review 244, p. 1-40.
Hayward, P.A., 2010 The Winchcombe and Coventry chronicles: hitherto unnoticed witnesses to the work of John of Worcester, (2 vols.) Tempe, Arizona Center for Medieval and Renaissance Studies.
Hughes, Kathleen, 1974 'The Welsh Latin chronicles: Annales Cambriae and related texts', in (1980) Celtic Britain in the Early Middle Ages, Boydell, pp. 67–85.
Hughes, Kathleen, 1980 'The A-text of Annales Cambriae, in Celtic Britain in the Early Middle Ages, Boydell, pp. 86–100
Jones, T., 1948, Cronica de Wallia and other Documents from Exeter Cathedral Library MS. 3514, Oxford University Press.
Ker, N.R. 1955, 'Sir John Prise'. The Library, 5th series, x (1955), p. 1-24.
Miller, Molly, 1975 'The Commanders at Arthuret', Transactions of the Cumberland and Westmorland Archaeological and Antiquarian Society, New Series, 75, pp. 96–118.
Miller, Molly, 1977/8 'Date-Guessing and Dyfed', Studia Celtica 12/13, pp. 33–61.
Miller, Molly, 1979 'The disputed historical horizon of the Pictish king-lists', Scottish Historical Review, 58, pp. 1–34.
+Miller, Molly, 2004 'Final stages in the construction of the Harleian Annales Cambriae: the evidence of the framework' in The Journal of Celtic Studies JCS 4, Brepols.
Phillimore, Egerton (ed.), 1888 'The Annales Cambriae and Old Welsh Genealogies from Harleian MS. 3859', Y Cymmrodor 9 (1888) pp. 141–183 .
Phillimore, Egerton (ed.), 1890/1  'The publication of the Welsh historical records', Y Cymmrodor 11 (1890/1) pp. 133–75.
Remfry, P.M., 2007, Annales Cambriae.  A Translation of Harleian 3859; PRO E.164/1; Cottonian Domitian, A 1; Exeter Cathedral Library MS. 3514 and MS Exchequer DB Neath, PRO E, Castle Studies Research and Publishing

Stephenson, David, 2008 'Welsh Chronicles' Accounts of the Mid-Twelfth Century', Cambrian Medieval Celtic Studies, No. 56, Aberystwyth, CMCS, pp 45–57.
Stephenson, David, 2010 'Gerald of Wales and Annales Cambriae ', Cambrian Medieval Celtic Studies, No. 60, Aberystwyth, CMCS, pp 24–37.
Wiseman, Howard, 2000 'The derivation of the date of Badon in the Annales Cambriae from Bede and Gildas' Parergon 17.2, pp. 1–10.
Wiseman, Howard, 2002 'The derivation of the date of the Arthurian entries in the Annales Cambriae from Bede and Gildas'  Vortigern Studies website

 External links 

Complete editions of A, B, C, D and E are available here
An English translation of the original annals (combining text from MSS. A, B & C''' for the period from the mid-5th century to the mid-10th) can be found here.

Medieval Welsh literature
Arthurian literature in Latin
Welsh chronicles
Medieval Latin historical texts
10th-century history books
10th-century Latin books